D4, zinc and double PHD fingers family 1 is a protein that in humans is encoded by the DPF1 gene.

References

Further reading 

Genes
Human proteins